Dozdak-e Sofla (also Romanized as Dozdak-e Soflá; also known as Dozdak-e Pā’īn) is a village in Rostam-e Do Rural District, in the Central District of Rostam County, Fars Province, Iran. At the 2006 census, its population was 93, in 20 families.

References 

Populated places in Rostam County